Coplan Saves His Skin is a 1968 French-Italian Francis Coplan Eurospy film directed by Yves Boisset (at his directorial debut) and starring Claudio Brook. It is the last chapter in the Francis Coplan film series.

Cast
 Claudio Brook - Francis Coplan
 Margaret Lee - Mara / Eva
 Jean Servais - Saroghu
 Bernard Blier - Marscar
 Jean Topart - Lieutenant Sakki
 Hans Meyer - Hugo
 Nanna Michael - Carole
 Klaus Kinski - Theler
 Marcella Saint-Amant - Yasmine
 Roger Lumont - Le glouton
 Roberto - Le nain / Dwarf
 Agatha Alma - Faith
 Andrea Aureli - Gamal (as Andrew Ray)
 Aldo Canti - Voyou (as Nick Jordan)
 Sergio Jossa - Barman

References

External links

1968 films
1960s spy thriller films
French spy thriller films
1960s French-language films
Films directed by Yves Boisset
1960s French films